Players and pairs who neither have high enough rankings nor receive wild cards may participate in a qualifying tournament held one week before the annual Wimbledon Tennis Championships.

Seeds

  Els Callens (first round)
  Cătălina Cristea (first round)
  María Vento (qualifying competition, lucky loser)
  Meilen Tu (second round)
  Tang Min (first round)
  Erika deLone (qualifying competition)
  Rita Grande (second round)
  Mercedes Paz (second round)
  Eugenia Maniokova (first round)
  Denisa Szabová (qualifying competition)
  Dally Randriantefy (second round)
  Lindsay Lee (qualified)
  Tatiana Panova (qualifying competition)
  Kim de Weille (second round)
  Laxmi Poruri (qualifying competition)
  Katrina Adams (qualified)

Qualifiers

  Katrina Adams
  Melanie Schnell
  Claudia Porwik
  Lindsay Lee
  Rennae Stubbs
  Amanda Wainwright
  Petra Kamstra
  Gloria Pizzichini

Lucky loser
  María Vento

Qualifying draw

First qualifier

Second qualifier

Third qualifier

Fourth qualifier

Fifth qualifier

Sixth qualifier

Seventh qualifier

Eighth qualifier

External links

1995 Wimbledon Championships on WTAtennis.com
1995 Wimbledon Championships – Women's draws and results at the International Tennis Federation

Women's Singles Qualifying
Wimbledon Championship by year – Women's singles qualifying
Wimbledon Championships